Mohibullah Khan is a former world  squash champion from Pakistan. He was one of the game's leading players in the 1970s, reaching a career-high ranking of World No. 2. He was runner-up at the inaugural World Open in 1976, and at the British Open in 1976, losing on both occasions to Australia's Geoff Hunt.

Mohibullah Khan won a lot of International Squash Championships throughout the World. He won prestigious World Master Squash Championship and Irish Master Squash Championship beating Australia's  Geoff Hunt.

In 1976, Mohibullah Khan won Pakistan International Airlines World Series in England. Queen Elizabeth II was the Chief Guest and gave him the winning trophy i.e. Sword.

Apart from this, he won British Amateur Squash championships, Australian opens, New Zealand opens, US Championships, Alexandrian squash championships, French squash opens, Pakistan opens and many more.

Mohibullah Khan was a very quick and energetic player. His power of shots was extremely extra ordinary.

Mohibullah's younger brother Jansher Khan became one of the dominant players in squash in the late-1980s and 1990s. Mohibullah Khan coached Jansher Khan. It was due to his coaching that Jansher Khan remained the World No. 1 squash player for many years, including a record of winning 8 World opens and 6 British opens.

In 1993 Pakistan won World Team Squash Championship under the coaching of Mr.Mohibullah khan. The team members were Jansher Khan, Jahangir Khan, Zarak Jahan Khan, and Mir Zaman Gul.

In recognition of Mohibullah khan achievements for the country in the field of squash, President of Pakistan Mr Farooq Ahmad Khan Leghari awarded Him Pakistan's highest Civil award President pride of Performance in 1995.

Nowadays Mohibullah Khan is serving in Pakistan Sports Board in Bps 19 as Director Squash Coaches of Pakistan.

Admiring his services for squash in Pakistan, the Federal Minister for IPC Mian Riaz Hussain Pirzada renamed PSB Squash complex Peshawar as Mohibullah Khan squash complex on 29 May 2015.

Mohibullah Khan is also running his academy named Mohibullah Khan squash Academy in Peshawar under the Pakistan Sports Board since 2006. The academy trains players for Pakistan squash.

References

 
 Article at The-south-asian.com

External links
 

Pashtun people
Pakistani male squash players
Living people
Recipients of the Pride of Performance
Year of birth missing (living people)